Asbolus verrucosus (LeConte, 1852), also known as the desert ironclad beetle or blue death feigning beetle, is a species of darkling beetle native to the deserts of the Southwestern United States, notably the Sonoran desert. It is highly adapted to hot environments and is omnivorous, consuming dead insects, fruits, lichen, and other plant matter. When threatened, the beetles are able to feign death. The species is becoming increasingly popular in the pet trade, due to their ease of care, hardiness, and longevity.

Description
The species name verrucosus, meaning 'warty', refers to the characteristic bumps on the beetle's elytra. The powdery blue hue of the beetles is due to a wax coating on their bodies that prevents loss of moisture. High humidity darkens the color of the beetles.

Males are slightly smaller than females, and have bristly red hairs on their antennae. The beetles are crepuscular, being most active at dawn and dusk.

Captivity
The majority of captive beetles are wild-caught, but suit very well in captivity. Care requirements are minimal, as the beetles do not require extensive humidity or heating regulation, and only require sandy substrate and hides to rest under. The beetles are unable to climb on smooth surfaces (plastic or glass), and their diets are extremely diverse—they can be fed vegetables, fruits, lichen, shrimp, dead insects, as well as dog and cat foods. Blue death feigning beetles have been successfully kept with desert hairy scorpions and/or velvet ants, and are well suited to communal arrangements.

Current research
In 2015, the complete mitochondrial genome of the desert darkling beetle was sequenced, funded by the Blue Beetle Genome Project. As of 2015, it was the first fully assembled mitogenome sequence for a darkling beetle in the subfamily Pimeliinae.

The blue death feigning beetle is notoriously difficult to breed in captivity and rear to adulthood; in 2018, researchers at the Cincinnati Zoo were able to rear their first adult beetle after beginning breeding in 2014. Hobbyists have publicly documented their experience with successfully breeding their beetles, noting issues with maintaining proper humidity and heating required for larvae to pupate.

References

Tenebrionidae
Fauna of the Southwestern United States
Beetles described in 1851